The Krog Street Tunnel is a tunnel in Atlanta known for its street art. The tunnel links the Cabbagetown, Reynoldstown, and Inman Park neighborhoods. It is very popular among cyclists, and is proposed to be used as part of the BeltLine, for bicyclists and pedestrians to cross Hulsey Yard.

2014 protest
In October 2014, The Atlanta Foundation for Public Spaces planned a masquerade which was to be a private and ticket-only event. The event was voted down at the local Neighborhood Planning Unit, but a permit was approved by the city anyway. This move angered neighbors, who would not have access to the tunnel during the masquerade. Local artist Peter Ferarri stated, "I think artists were upset that their work was being used to promote and sell tickets to this party without any compensation to them."

At 10pm on October 22, 2014, a hundred protesters gathered to paint over all of the art with grey paint, rendering the tunnel art-less for the masquerade.

See also
Arts in Atlanta

References

External links
 The Daily Krog - "A picture a day...from the...Krog Street Tunnel"
 CNN Radio article

Culture of Atlanta
Graffiti in the United States
Public art in the United States
Tunnels in Georgia (U.S. state)
Roadside attractions in Georgia (U.S. state)